Kanai is a district as well as a village in Zangon Kataf Local Government Area of southern Kaduna state in the Middle Belt region of Nigeria. The postal code of the area is 802139.

Geography

Landscape
Kanai possesses an elevation of 802m.

Climate

Settlements
 The following are some major settlements in Kanai district include:
 Adidyong
 Atabat Atanyeang
 Atabum
 Atak Ma-Gangkwon
 Apyifak
 Apyimbu
 Ayak
 Aza Magoni
 Bafoi (also Sanai)
 Bato (Boto)
 Gan
 Kakwa
 Kanai Mali (also Atsung Abyek)
 Ma-Adangung
 Ma-Avwuong
 Magwafan (H. Bakin Kogi)
 Manyii-Chendidan (H. Rafin Wawa)
 Ma-Pama
 Sagwaza
 Sako
 Sankwap (also Runji)
 Sashyat
 Sazwat
 Sop Gandu

Demographics
The district consists primarily of the Atyap people.

Population

At the 1963 Nigerian population census, the population of the entire district was put at 8,660. On the Kaduna State government estimate for 1991, however, the population was put at 17,290.

Economy

Agriculture is the major occupation of the people, being that the area is primarily rural.

Domestic water supply
A survey carried out in 2012 in three villages in the district namely, Sankhwap (Runji), Kanai Mali (H. Gora Gida), and Sagwaza, covering 88 households discovered that over half of them rely on shallow hand-dug wells and natural water bodies which are prone to drought, with only 3% of them able to harvest rainwater for usage.

Notable people
 Senator Isaiah Balat, politician, entrepreneur
 DJ Bally, DJ, music producer
 Agwam (Dr.) Harrison Yusuf Bungwon, Agwatyap II
 Agwam Bala Ade Dauke, Agwatyap I
 Prof. Kyuka Usman Lilymjok, lawyer, writer

See also
 Atak Nfang
 Atyap chiefdom
 Jei
 List of villages in Kaduna State
 Zonzon

References

 Bibliography
 Achi, B.; Bitiyonɡ, Y. A.; Bunɡwon, A. D.; Baba, M. Y.; Jim, L. K. N.; Kazah-Toure, M.; Philips, J. E. "A Short History of the Atyap" (2019). Zaria: Tamaza Publishinɡ Co. Ltd. . Pp. 9–245.

External links
 Evaluating the potential of rainwater harvesting as a supplementary source of water supply in Kanai (Mali) district of Zangon-kataf local government area of Kaduna State, Nigeria

Populated places in Kaduna State
Atyap chiefdom